Joel Roca Casals (born 7 June 2005) is a Spanish professional footballer who plays as a winger for Girona FC B.

Club career
Born in Camprodon, Girona, Catalonia, Roca began playing football in his hometown , where he was a top goalscorer. He moved to the youth academy of FC Barcelona in 2016, and then to Girona FC's youth sides in 2019. In September 2021 at the age of 16, he debuted for the latter's reserves in the Tercera División RFEF, jumping up four youth categories in three years. On 3 June 2022, he extended his contract with the club keeping him until 2026. 

Roca made his professional – and La Liga – debut with Girona on 26 August 2022, coming on as a late substitute in a 1–0 loss to RC Celta de Vigo.

International career
Roca is a youth international for Spain, having played up to the Spain U19s.

Playing style
A diminutive winger, Roca is a dynamic goalscorer with great verticality.

References

External links
 
 
 

2005 births
Living people
People from Ripollès
Sportspeople from the Province of Girona
Spanish footballers
Spain youth international footballers
Association football wingers
Girona FC players
Girona FC B players
La Liga players
Tercera Federación players